Iravu Pookkal is a 1986 Indian Tamil-language crime thriller film directed by Sreedhar Rajan, starring Sathyaraj and Nalini. It was released on 19 September 1986.

Plot

Cast 
 Sathyaraj as Inspector Rajadurai
 Nalini as Meena
 Jeevitha as a girl sold into prostitution
 Anuradha as a bar dancer
 M. N. Nambiar
 Nizhalgal Ravi
 Raveendar as the deaf-mute man
 Prameela as the brothel keeper
 Y. G. Mahendran
 Calcutta Viswanathan

Production 
Iravu Pookkal is the second and penultimate film directed by Sreedhar Rajan. It was a rare film at a time when Sathyaraj, who was playing mostly negative roles, portrayed the lead character.<ref>{{Cite web |last=ராஜன் |first=அய்யனார் |date=6 March 2018 |title=" 'ஆர்வம் இருக்குல்ல, அது போதும்'ன்னார், சத்யஜித் ரே! - இன்றைய சூழலை அன்றே சொன்ன 'கண் சிவந்தால் மண் சிவக்கும்' #35YearsOfKannSivanthaalMannSivakkum |url=https://cinema.vikatan.com/tamil-cinema/118399-sridhar-rajan-interview-about-35-years-of-kann-sivanthaal-mann-sivakkum |url-access=subscription |url-status=live |archive-url=https://web.archive.org/web/20221221085432/https://cinema.vikatan.com/tamil-cinema/118399-sridhar-rajan-interview-about-35-years-of-kann-sivanthaal-mann-sivakkum |archive-date=21 December 2022 |access-date=21 December 2022 |website=Ananda Vikatan |language=ta}}</ref>

 Soundtrack 
The music was composed by Ilaiyaraaja, with lyrics by Gangai Amaran.

 Release and reception Iravu Pookkal was released on 19 September 1986. Kalki'' lauded the performances of Prameela and Sathyaraj, saying the director could be appreciated for sticking to the source material and not exploiting the scenes.

References

External links 
 

1980s crime thriller films
1980s Tamil-language films
Films about prostitution in India
Films directed by Sreedhar Rajan
Films scored by Ilaiyaraaja
Indian crime thriller films